Carposina gigantella is a moth in the Carposinidae family. It is found on the Canary Islands.

The wingspan is about 25 mm. The forewings are mixed whitish grey and brown. The hindwings are grey.

References

Carposinidae
Moths described in 1917